Daigneault is a surname. Notable people with the surname include:

Barbara Daigneault, victim of the École Polytechnique massacre in 1989 in Montreal, Quebec, Canada
Doug Daigneault, Canadian Football League player
Frédéric-Hector Daigneault (1860–1933), Canadian provincial politician
J. J. Daigneault (born 1965), retired Canadian professional ice hockey defenceman
Julie Daigneault (born 1965), former international freestyle swimmer from Canada
Mark Daigneault (born 1985), American basketball coach

See also
Dagneux
Daignet
Diagnal

de:Daigneault